Assa Aïcha Sylla (born 3 June 1996) is a French actress and writer. She debuted in the film Girlhood (2014), which earned her César and Black Reel Award nominations. She has since starred in the French version of Skam (2018–2020), the Netflix series Mortel (2019), and the film The Last Mercenary (2021).

Early life
Sylla was born in the 15th arrondissement of Paris south of the river to Soninke parents from Mauritania, her father a cleaner and her mother a stay-at-home mother, and grew up in the Barbès area of the 18th arrondissement north of the river. She has three sisters and two brothers. She is Muslim.

Sylla attended Lycée Edgar Quinet Filières Professionnelles. She was scouted at 17 by the Girlhood casting directors when she accompanied her friends to the auditions. Then, she played the role of the Franco-Malian boxer Aya Cissoko in Danbé, la tête haute - portraying the boxer's teenage years. For this role, she took intensive boxing lessons whilst continuing to study for her baccalauréat professionnel.

Bibliography
 "Raising Hope" in My Profession is Not Black by Aïssa Maïga (2018)

Filmography

Film
{| class="wikitable sortable"
|-
! Year
! Title
! Role
! class="unsortable" | Notes
|-
| 2014
| Girlhood
| Lady Sophie
| 
|-
| 2016
| Verdon Secret
| Clara
|
|-
| 2016 
| Na tout pour elle
| Aminata
| Short film
|-
| 2017
| Accidental Family
| Young Woman
| 
|-
| 2017
| Lola Pater
| Caroline
| 
|-
| 2017
| Chateau
| Starting Woman
| 
|-
| 2018
| Blue Queen
| Nina
| Short film
|-
| 2019
| Plus jamais je ne t'aimerai
| Assa
| Short film
|-
| 2019
| Numéro 10
| Awa
| Short film
|-
| 2021
| The Last Mercenary
| Dalila
|-
|2024
|   Le Roi Des Ombres

Television

Web

Awards and nominations

References

External links

1996 births
Living people
21st-century French actresses
Actresses from Paris
French Muslims
French people of Mauritanian descent
Soninke people